A list of films produced in Japan ordered by year in the 1990s.  For an A-Z of films see :Category:Japanese films.

1990s
Japanese films of 1990
Japanese films of 1991
Japanese films of 1992
Japanese films of 1993
Japanese films of 1994
Japanese films of 1995
Japanese films of 1996
Japanese films of 1997
Japanese films of 1998
Japanese films of 1999

External links
 Japanese film at the Internet Movie Database

1990s
Japanese
 Films